Li Kochman (or Lee, ; born 18 April 1995) is an Israeli judoka. He competes in the under 90 kg weight category, and won a silver medal in the 2019 European Judo Championships.

Judo career

2011-19
In 2011 Kochman won a bronze medal at the Cadet European Championships (U-17). In 2014 he won a bronze medal at the European U-23s.

In 2015 he won bronze at the Budapest Grand Prix (U90kg). In 2016 Kochman won a silver medal at the Zagreb Grand Prix.

In 2017 Kochman won the gold medal at the European Open in Belgrade. That year he lost in the finals of the European Open in Minsk and the European Open in Bucharest.

In 2018 he won a silver medal at the European Open in Sofia. That year he also won a bronze medal at the Tbilisi Grand Prix.

In 2019 Kochman won a silver medal at the European Games in Minsk.

2020-present
Kochman represented Israel at the 2020 Summer Olympics, competing at the men's 90 kg weight category. After beating Czech David Klammert in his first match, Kochman lost to the reigning European champion, Georgian Lasha Bekauri in the round of 16, ending his part of the individual contest. Bekauri went on to win the gold medal.

Titles
Source:

References

External links

 
 
 Li Kochman at the European Judo Union
 

1995 births
Living people
Israeli male judoka
Judoka at the 2019 European Games
European Games medalists in judo
European Games silver medalists for Israel
Israeli Jews
Jewish Israeli sportspeople
Judoka at the 2020 Summer Olympics
Olympic judoka of Israel
Medalists at the 2020 Summer Olympics
Olympic medalists in judo
Olympic bronze medalists for Israel
21st-century Israeli people